Amera may refer to:

People 
 Amera Eid, Australian belly dancer
 Amera Khalif (born 1929), Jordanian sports shooter

Other uses 
 MS Amera, a cruise ship
 Ben Amera, a monolith in Mauritania
 Amera, a village in Uttar Pradesh, India
 , a species of insect in the genus Psilotreta